Superconductors can be classified in accordance with several criteria that depend on physical properties, current understanding, and the expense of cooling them or their material.

By their magnetic properties 

 Type I superconductors: those having just one critical field, Hc, and changing abruptly from one state to the other when it is reached.
 Type II superconductors: having two critical fields, Hc1 and Hc2, being a perfect superconductor under the lower critical field (Hc1) and leaving completely the superconducting state to a normal conducting state above the upper critical field (Hc2), being in a mixed state when between the critical fields.

By the understanding we have about them 

 Conventional superconductors: those that can be fully explained with the BCS theory or related theories.
 Unconventional superconductors: those that failed to be explained using such theories, e.g.:
Heavy fermion superconductors

This criterion is important, as the BCS theory has explained the properties of conventional superconductors since 1957, yet there have been no satisfactory theories to explain unconventional superconductors fully. In most cases, type I superconductors are conventional, but there are several exceptions such as niobium, which is both conventional and type II.

By their critical temperature 

 Low-temperature superconductors, or LTS: those whose critical temperature is below 30 K.
 High-temperature superconductors, or HTS: those whose critical temperature is above 30 K.

Some now use 77 K as the split to emphasize whether or not we can cool the sample with liquid nitrogen (whose boiling point is 77K), which is much more feasible than liquid helium (an alternative to achieve the temperatures needed to get low-temperature superconductors).

By material constituents and structure 

 Some pure elements, such as lead or mercury (but not all pure elements, as some never reach the superconducting phase).
 Some allotropes of carbon, such as fullerenes, nanotubes, or diamond. 
Most superconductors made of pure elements are type I (except niobium, technetium, vanadium, silicon, and the above-mentioned Carbon allotropes)
 Alloys, such as
 Niobium-titanium (NbTi), whose superconducting properties were discovered in 1962.

 Ceramics (often insulators in the normal state), which include
 Cuprates i.e. copper oxides (often layered, not isotropic)
 The YBCO family, which are several yttrium-barium-copper oxides, especially YBa2Cu3O7. They are the most famous high-temperature superconductors.
 Iron-based superconductors, including the oxypnictides
 Magnesium diboride (MgB2), whose critical temperature is 39K, being the conventional superconductor with the highest known temperature.
 non-cuprate oxides such as BKBO
 other

See also

 Conventional superconductor
 covalent superconductors
 List of superconductors
 High-temperature superconductivity
 Room temperature superconductor
 Superconductivity
 Technological applications of superconductivity
 Timeline of low-temperature technology
 Type-I superconductor
 Type-II superconductor
 Unconventional superconductor

References 

Superconductivity